The Government Arsenal (GA) is an agency of the Philippine government under the Department of National Defense, responsible for the production of basic weaponry and ammunition for the Armed Forces of the Philippines (AFP), and the Philippine National Police (PNP), among others, and for the sale and export of products in excess of AFP/PNP requirements.

History
The Government Arsenal (GA) is located on a 370-hectare defense industrial estate in Lamao, Limay, Bataan, about 120 km from Manila by land, 70 km from Subic, and 90 km from Clark. Just three km from the Port of Limay, the Arsenal is strategically situated near the Petron Bataan Refinery, the Bataan Combined Cycle Power Plant, the National Power Corporation Plant, the Petro-Chemical Complex, and the Freeport Area at Mariveles, Bataan. To sustain its operations, the GA presently maintains and operates 124 buildings and structures sprawled over 70 hectares of land.

A creation of Republic Act No. 1884 which was signed into law on June 22, 1957, the Arsenal is a line bureau under the Department of National Defense. However, it was only about a decade later, on March 7, 1967, that a presidential proclamation on its present site at Limay, Bataan was declared. Accordingly, on October 12, 1967, the groundbreaking materialized at the spot where the statue of General Antonio Luna now stands. Site preparations were subsequently undertaken by the 514th and 564th Engineering Construction Battalions of the 51st Engineering Brigade of the Armed Forces of the Philippines (AFP). Construction of essential buildings and facilities then followed along with training abroad of selected military and newly hired civilian personnel on the manufacture of small arms ammunition (SAA).

On August 15, 1971, or fourteen (14) years after the enactment of the Republic Act 1884, the first SAA cartridge rolled out of the GA's production assembly line. Three years later, the integrated SAA manufacture began, with all the components - case, primer, propellant powder, and bullet assembled into a complete cartridge - manufactured in the arsenal.

On February 23, 1995, Republic Act 7898, otherwise known as the AFP Modernization Act, was enacted. Republic Act 7898 likewise provides for the modernization of the Government Arsenal for the development of production capabilities to enhance self-sufficiency in defense requirements. Specifically, Section 12 of this Act mandates that "the government arsenal shall be utilized in the production of basic weapons, ammunition and other munitions for the use of the Armed Forces of the Philippines and the Philippine National Police (PNP), and for the sale and export of products in excess of AFP/PNP requirements."

As part of the modernization effort, the arsenal, through the Department of National Defense, issued an invitation to bid for a Multi-Station Bullet Assembly Machine for 5.56mm M193/M855 in August 2009.  This marked a significant expansion of existing production lines. According to a supplemental bulletin, bids for this acquisition were to be opened on December 4, 2009.

On November 15, 2012, the Arsenal established its Small Arms Repair and Upgrade Unit (SARUU) to handle repair, refurbishment, upgrading and enhancement of the firearms of the military and law enforcement services.

On November 14, 2018, the Arsenal signed a co-production agreement with Samyang Comtech Co. Ltd. of South Korea to manufacturing and testing facilities within the Government Arsenal complex to produce armor vests and ballistic helmets.

On April 5, 2019, the arsenal broke ground for two major production facilities under co-production agreements with South Korean firms: a force protection equipment manufacturing plant in partnership with Samyang Comtech and a 5.56mm magazine manufacturing plant in partnership with Buhueng Precision.

On May 29, 2021, Secretary Lorenzana inspected GA's Building 27 or the mixing composition room after an explosion took place where two GA employees were killed, which he deemed to be a workplace accident.

On June 28, 2022, GA and Bataan City officials signed a memorandum of agreement to expand GA's estate in the freeport area.

Government Arsenal (GA) Strategic Plan 

The Government Arsenal Strategic Plan will serve as a guide or roadmap in the acquisition of necessary technologies to enhance the GA’s manufacturing capability in collaboration with the various defense industry players and the academe.

The GA Strategic Plan focuses on the following:

Phase 1: Self-Reliance and enhancement of Small Arms Production Capacity

1.1)  Acquisition of dedicated production line for 5.56mm and 9mm ammunition.

1.2) Construction of additional manufacturing plant and warehouses

2. Facility Support System:

2.1) Improvement of 1.3 km road from Main Gate to Dam area

2.2) Development of the  road from the  Dam area to the  Proposed GA-DIE

2.3) Construction of 30-m and 40-m access bridge

2.4) Construction of Perimeter Fence

2.5) Re-piping of Water line

2.6) Construction of Waste Water Treatment Facility

3. Acquisition of capability and establish Cold Rolling Mill for the local production of metallic raw materials;

4. Establishment of manufacturing facility and equipment for the in-house production of explosives material:

4.1) Acquisition of capability and establish a facility for in-country production of Propellant powder;

4.2) Acquisition of capability and establish a facility for the in-country production of Nitroglycerin and Nitrocellulose

4.3) Acquisition of equipment for in-house production of Trinitroresorcinol (TNR)

Phase 2: New Capability Development

5. Acquisition of capability and establish Bomb Melt Loading Facility

6. Acquisition of capability and establish a facility for the in-country production of 5.56mm magazine;

7. Acquisition of capability and establish a facility for the in-country production of Force Protection Equipment

8. Acquisition of necessary equipment and technology for the in-country production/assembly of 40m.

9. Acquisition of necessary equipment and technology for the in-country production/assembly of Cal. 50 ammunition;

10. Acquisition of capability and establish a facility for the manufacture of assault rifle

11. Establishment of Ballistics Testing Center

Phase 3: Other New Capability Development in collaboration with AFP Major Services

12. Collaboration with the Philippine Air Force to establish capability for the in-country production of peculiar air munitions;

13. Coordinate and collaborate with the Philippine Navy for the development of capability in the manufacture of peculiar Naval Ammunition such as; 76mm, 25mm, 20mm and 40mm;

14. Collaboration with various stakeholders to develop the capability for the in-country production of at least the basic mobility equipment for the defense and security establishments;

15. Collaboration with various stakeholders to develop the capability for the production of Combat Clothing and Individual Equipment (CCEI)

16. Collaboration with the various stakeholders to develop capability in the production of communications equipment; and

17. Collaboration with the AF, academe and the other concerned government agencies to develop capability in the production of missile systems.

Ammunition Marking System

Small arms ammunition manufactured by the Government Arsenal can be identified by the headstamp code: "RPA". This acronym stands for "Republic of the Philippines Arsenal".

In 2011, a new standard coding system was adopted by the arsenal following  formulation and final approval in October of the previous year. This replaced the previous coding system which was derived from the product codes of foreign manufacturers using a combination of English and Metric/Système International (SI) units. The revised system uses simplified alphanumeric designations that make reference to the ammunition's caliber and type for ease of identification while avoiding unnecessary complications caused by the use of mixed English & SI units and designations based on different foreign code systems.

To improve the accounting and traceability of government-produced munitions, the Government Arsenal has endeavored to implement laser engraving technology into its ammunition production process as part of the modernization of its production lines, making it the first domestic ammunition manufacturer to do so. This involved the acquisition of a laser marking and packaging machine for use with 5.56mm and 7.62mm ammunition. This will allow the marking of individual cartridges after their assembly and the labeling of ammunition packaging. Information on each ammunition batch produced will be stored in a database allowing for easier accounting of the origin, transfer, receipt, utilization and/or disposal of ammunition.

Images

See also
 GA 10" Personal Defense Weapon (PDW)
 7.62×37mm Musang
 Marine Scout Sniper Rifle

References

External links
GA Homepage

Military facilities in Bataan
Firearm manufacturers of the Philippines